The Frankford Slasher is the name given by the media to a possible serial killer who operated in and around the neighborhood of Frankford in Philadelphia, Pennsylvania from 1985 to 1990. Leonard Christopher was convicted in the murder of one of the nine supposedly linked victims, but the others remain unsolved. All the victims were sexually assaulted and stabbed to death. Several of the victims were seen with a middle-aged white man shortly before their deaths.

Possible victims
Helen Patent, 52, killed August 19, 1985
Anna Carroll, 68, killed January 3, 1986
Suzanna Olszef, 64, killed December 25, 1986
Jeanne Durkin, 28, killed January 8, 1987
Catherine M. Jones, 29, killed January 1987 (connection to other murders is disputed)
Margaret Vaughan, 66, killed November 11, 1988
Theresa Sciortino, 30, killed January 19, 1989
Carol Dowd, 46, killed April 29, 1990 (Leonard Christopher was convicted of her death)
Michelle Dehner, 30, killed September 6, 1990 (Occurred while Leonard Christopher was in jail)

Leonard Christopher
During the investigation into the death of Carol Dowd, Leonard Christopher, an employee at a nearby fish market, became a suspect. Despite the fact that he did not match the witness's description, and that there was no evidence to link him to any of the other eight murders, and only circumstantial evidence linking him to Dowd's murder, he was tried and convicted of one count of first degree murder on December 12, 1990, and sentenced to life in prison. He has since died of cancer, maintaining his innocence since the beginning.

See also
 Crime in Philadelphia

General:
List of fugitives from justice who disappeared
List of serial killers in the United States

References

1985 murders in the United States
American rapists
American serial killers
Criminals from Philadelphia
Unidentified serial killers